John Proudfoot (27 February 1874 – 22 April 1934) was a Scottish footballer who played in the Football League for Blackburn Rovers and Everton.

He began his career with Partick Thistle and returned there for a season after seven years in England; four of his brothers also played for the team, with David being the most prominent.

References

1874 births
1934 deaths
Scottish footballers
English Football League players
Scottish Football League players
Southern Football League players
Association football forwards
Partick Thistle F.C. players
Blackburn Rovers F.C. players
Everton F.C. players
Watford F.C. players
Hamilton Academical F.C. players
Footballers from Airdrie, North Lanarkshire